Sunil Asoka Jayasinghe (15 July 1955 – 20 April 1995) was a Sri Lankan ODI cricketer who played two ODIs in the 1979 World Cup competition (the subsequent British Isles tour incorporated his only first-class appearances).

He was educated at Nalanda College Colombo and captained the college first XI team in 1974. For many years he represented Bloomfield CC and during the 1982/83 Lakspray Trophy compiled a monumental 283 against Colombo CC (this tournament was only recognised as first-class from 1988 to 1989).

He committed suicide aged 39.

References

1955 births
Sri Lankan cricketers
Sri Lanka One Day International cricketers
Alumni of Nalanda College, Colombo
1995 suicides
Cricketers at the 1979 Cricket World Cup
Suicides in Sri Lanka
People from Kalutara District
Wicket-keepers